Jérémy Bottin (born 19 August 1973) is a Monegasque bobsledder. He competed in the two man event at the 2006 Winter Olympics. In 2019, Bottin became the President of the Monegasque Association of Olympic Athletes.

References

External links
 

1973 births
Living people
Monegasque male bobsledders
Olympic bobsledders of Monaco
Bobsledders at the 2006 Winter Olympics
Place of birth missing (living people)